Change Charagua (in Spanish: Cambio Charagua), a political grouping that contested the December 2004 municipal elections in Charagua, Santa Cruz Department, Bolivia. CACHA won one of the five council seats. In total it received 12.8% of the votes.

External links
Article about the election at the Cipca website

Political parties in Bolivia